The Federal University of Technology Akure (informally FUT Akure or simply FUTA) is a federal government-owned university located in Akure, Ondo State, Nigeria. It was founded in 1981 driven by the federal government of Nigeria to create universities that specialised in producing graduates with practical as well as theoretical knowledge of technologies.

Other universities of technology established around the same time were the Federal University of Technology Owerri, the Federal University of Technology, Abeokuta (FUTAB), which later metamorphosed to the present University of Agriculture, Abeokuta (FUNAAB), the Federal University of Technology Minna, the Federal University of Technology Yola, and the Federal University of Technology Bauchi (now Abubakar Tafawa Balewa University).

Ranking
Federal University of Technology Akure has been ranked the eighth-best university and best university of technology in Nigeria by webometrics as of January 2020. In 2022, It was ranked as the 5th best university in Nigeria by World University Rankings.

Administration and leadership
The current principal members of the university administration and their positions are as follows:

Faculties

The university has nine schools and a college of medicine: 
 College of Health Sciences
 School of Basic Medical Sciences (SBMS)
 School of Basic Clinical Sciences (SBCS)
 School of Clinical Sciences (SCS)
 School of Computing (SOC)
 School of Life Science (SLS)
 School of Physical Science (SPS)
 School of Earth and Mineral Sciences (SEMS)
 School of Environmental Technology (SET)
 School of Engineering and Engineering Technology (SEET)
 School of Agriculture and Agricultural Technology (SAAT)
 School of Logistics and Innovation Technology (SLIT)
 School of Postgraduate Studies (SPGS)

The school runs pre-degree science programs, Short-Term courses and University Advanced Basic Science programs.

Library

Among the notable structures in the university is the central library, Albert Ilemobade Library, located just beside the School of Engineering and Engineering Technology. The library, which has a large capacity for students, contains books relating to virtually all fields of knowledge both in and outside the university community. To ensure it’s accessible, students are made to carry out their library registration in their first year of admission.

The Library is named after Professor Albert Ilemobade, who was the second Vice-Chancellor of the university. It was established in 1982, out of the desires of the founding fathers and matriarch of the institution in order to cut a niche for research and sound teaching. It started off in the Old Library Complex located at Oba Kekere (Mini campus), by April 2006, it moved to its permanent ultra-modern building which covers a floor space area of 1,614.74 m² and can sit 2,500 readers at a time. The building is a two storey building of imposing size designed to accommodate the variety of resources and facilities, with the availability of Internet access to books and journals and other services the Library has to offer to her user community.

It is open to all senior staff, students of the institution, as well as alumni of the university. The library also admit anyone else with cogent reasons with provision of letter of introduction from a recognized university official (i.e. dean of a faculty, head of department from the visitor's school or director of an organization).

Student life
The university operates a radio station, FUTA Radio (93.1 MHz), on the campus.

Vice-chancellors
The vice chancellors since 1981 include:

Theodore Idibiye Francis (1981–1987)
Albert Adeoye Ilemobade (1987–1995)
Lawrence Babatope Kolawole (1996–1999)
Ekundayo Adeyinka Adeyemi (acting; January 2000 – September 2001)
Robert Adebowale Ogunsusi (acting; October 2001 – December 2001)
Peter Olufemi Adeniyi (2002–2006)
Adebisi Mojeed Balogun (2007–2012)
Emmanuel Adebayo Fashakin (acting; February 2012 – May 2012)
Adebiyi Gregory Daramola (May 2012 – May 2017)
Joseph Adeola Fuwape (May 2017 – May 2022)
Adenike Temidayo Oladiji (24 May 2022 – present)

Notable alumni 

 Godman Akinlabi, Lead pastor of The Elevation Church, Lagos
 Adenike Akinsemolu, environmental sustainability advocate and social entrepreneur
 Ndubuisi Ekekwe, nigerian professor, inventor, engineer, author, and entrepreneur
 Opeyemi Gbenga Kayode (Pepenazi), hip-hop singer and songwriter
Babajide Oluwase- Founder Eco tutu

Gallery of campus

References

 
Akure
Educational institutions established in 1981
1981 establishments in Nigeria
Universities and colleges in Ondo State
Federal universities of Nigeria
Technological universities in Nigeria